The Pigotts Bullets Football Club is an Antigua and Barbuda Football Association team playing in the local second level – the First Division.  After working their way through the ranks, they secured a Premier Division berth in the Antigua and Barbuda Football Association League after the 2010/2011 season.

Motto
TEAM: Together Each Achieves More

Executive committee
2011–2012
President – Enoch Gore
Vice President – Phillip Auguiste
General Secretary – Jesse Thomas
Team Manager – Rhea Jarvis
Captain – Gershum Philip

Football clubs in Antigua and Barbuda
1980 establishments in Antigua and Barbuda